Gronau railway station may refer to 
Gronau (Westf) railway station in North Rhine-Westphalia, Germany
Bad Vilbel-Gronau railway station in Bad Vilbel, Hesse, Germany